Renmin Road Subdistrict  is a subdistrict  situated in Yingjiang District, Anqing, Anhui, China. , it administers the following four residential neighborhoods:
Paoyingshan
Xianfeng
Kangxihe
Dongzheng

See also
 List of township-level divisions of Anhui

References

Township-level divisions of Anhui
Anqing
Subdistricts of the People's Republic of China